The Cape Fear  Sevens is a North American rugby sevens (the seven a side version of rugby union) tournament held the first weekend in July every year in North Carolina. Cape Fear 7's is one of the nation's largest Summer 7's tournaments and features one of the most competitive premiere divisions hosting teams from across the country and around the world year in and year out.
It has been won by English teams Bristol, Harlequins and Bedford in 1984, 1986 and 1991.

Results
 2012 USA Rugby South Invitational
 2011 Pacific Island Barbarians
 2010 Pacific Islanders MD
 2009 Life University Marietta, GA
 2008  NOVA     Arlington, VA
 2006	England U.	England
 2005	OMBAC	San Diego, CA
 2004	Widgets	MARFU Invitational
 2003	Charlotte	Charlotte, NC
 2002	 NOVA	 Arlington, VA
 2001	 NOVA	 Arlington, VA
 2000	 NOVA	 Arlington, VA
 1999	 NOVA	 Arlington, VA
 1998	 NOVA	 Arlington, VA
 1997	 NOVA	 Arlington, VA
 1996	 Atlantis	 Invitational
 1995	 NOVA	 Arlington, VA
 1994	 Atlantis	 Invitational
 1993	 Old Blue	 New York, NY
 1992	 Washington	 Washington, DC
 1991	 Bedford	 Bedford, England
 1990	 Washington	 Washington, DC
 1989	 Maryland Old Boys	 Maryland
 1988	 Duck Brothers	 Arlington, VA
 1987	 Duck Brothers	 Arlington, VA
 1986	 Harlequins	 London, England
 1985	 Duck Brothers	 Arlington, VA
 1984	 Bristol	 Bristol, England
 1983	 Duck Brothers	 Arlington, VA
 1982	 Duck Brothers	 Arlington, VA
 1981	 Richmond	 Richmond, VA
 1980	 Norfolk	 Norfolk, VA
 1979	 Norfolk	 Norfolk, VA
 1978	 Roanoke	 Roanoke, VA
 1977	 Norfolk	 Norfolk, VA
 1976	 Roanoke	 Roanoke, VA
 1975	 Univ. of Virginia	 Charlottesville, VA

See also
 Rugby union in the United States

References

External links
 Cape Fear Rugby
 Rugby7.com
 Sevens

Rugby sevens competitions in the United States